The Sir Julius Vogel Awards are awarded each year at the New Zealand National Science Fiction Convention to recognise achievement in New Zealand science fiction, fantasy, horror, and science fiction fandom. They are commonly referred to as the Vogels.

Name

The awards are named for Sir Julius Vogel, a prominent New Zealand journalist and politician, who was Premier of New Zealand twice during the 1870s. He also, in 1889, wrote what is widely regarded as New Zealand's first science fiction novel, Anno Domini 2000, or, Woman's Destiny. The book, written and published in Great Britain after Vogel had moved from New Zealand, pictured a New Zealand in the year 2000 where most positions of authority were held by women—at the time of writing, a radical proposition. In 2000, New Zealand's Head of State, Governor General, Prime Minister, Chief Justice and Attorney General were all women, as was the CEO of one of the country's largest companies, Telecom.

History
National awards have been presented annually since 1989, but were initially simply known as the New Zealand Science Fiction Fan Awards, and were originally aimed primarily at fandom rather than at professional science fiction. In these early years the awards were organised on an ad-hoc basis by the organising committees of the national conventions, though with the support of the former national fan organisation, the National Association for Science Fiction which nominally ran the awards from 1993. In the early 1990s the awards were briefly known as the Edmund Bayne Awards, after a well-known Wellington fan who had been killed in a road accident, but this name was never formalised.

In 2002 the awards were revamped and reorganised, and since that time have been aimed more at the professional science fiction and fantasy community. The current name also dates to 2002. These changes accompanied a change in the organisation of the awards, which are now formally run by national organisation SFFANZ (the Science Fiction and Fantasy Association of New Zealand).

Categories change to some extent on an annual basis, but generally include professional awards for best novel, short story, dramatic presentation, and services to science fiction, as well as equivalent fan awards. Due to the size of New Zealand's science fiction, fantasy, and horror fiction communities, the awards cover all three of these frequently intertwined genres and attempt to treat each equally.

New Zealand science fiction fan award winners 1989-2001
1989
Best fan writing: Alan Robson
Best fanzine: Phlogiston
Best fan art: Dan McCarthy
Best fan editor: Alex Heatley
Numerous other one-off awards were made in these debut awards

1990
Best fan writing (general): Alan Robson
Best fan writing (media): Lana Brown
Best fanzine: Cry Havoc
Best media fanzine: Katra
Best fan art: Peter Gainsford
Best fan editor: Lyn McConchie

1991
Best fan writing: Alan Robson
Best fanzine: Phlogiston
Best fan art: Dan McCarthy
Best fan editor: Alex Heatley

1992
Best fan writing: Alan Robson
Best fanzine: Phlogiston
Best fan art (tie): James Benson and Mike Hanson
Best fan editor (tie): James Dignan and Alex Heatley

1993
Best fan writing: Jon Preddle
Best general fanzine: Timestreams
Best club fanzine: Time Space Visualiser
Best fan art: Warwick Gray
Special achievement: Lana Brown

1994
Best fan writing: Anne Marie Lloyd
Best fanzine: Chunder
Best fan art: Mark Roach
Best other publication: Trimmings from the Triffid's Beard

1995
Best fan writing: Peter Friend and Li Cross (co-authors)
Best fanzine: Time Space Visualiser
Best fan art: Warwick Gray
Best other publication: The Best of Time Space Visualiser 21-26
Special achievement: Continuum convention committee

1996
Best fan writing: Peter Friend
Best fanzine: Phoenixine
Best fan art: Nick Kim

1997-2000 (details unknown)

2001
Best fan writing: Jon Preddle
Best fanzine: Phoenixine
Best fan art: Richard Manx
Services to fandom: Paul Scoones

Professional award winners since 2002

2002
Best Novel: First Hunter by Dale Elvy
Best Short Story: "The Good Earth" by Peter Friend
Dramatic Presentation - Long Form: The Lord of the Rings: The Fellowship of the Ring
Best New Talent: Dale Elvy
Services to Science Fiction and Fantasy: Peter Jackson, Fran Walsh, and Phillipa Boyens

2003
Best Novel: Beast Master’s Ark by Andre Norton and Lyn McConchie
Best Art Work: John Baster, Mary Maclachlan
Services to Science Fiction and Fantasy: Weta Workshop, Weta Digital

2004
Best Novel: Dark Shinto by Dale Elvy
Best Short Story (tie): "A Plea for Help" by Kevin G Maclean and "The Alchemist" by Peter Friend
Best New Talent: Glynne Maclean
Special Award: Peter Jackson and the team responsible for The Lord of the Rings film trilogy

2005
Best Novel: Beastmaster’s Circus by Lyn McConchie and Andre Norton
Best Short Story: "When Dragons Dream” by Kevin G Maclean
Services to Science Fiction and Fantasy: Ken Catran

2006
Best Novel: The Duke's Ballad by Andre Norton and Lyn McConchie
Best Short Story: "The Real Deal” by Peter Friend
Services to Science Fiction and Fantasy: Margaret Mahy

2007
Best Novel: The Assassin of Gleam by James Norcliffe
Best Short Story: "Western Front, 1914” by Peter Friend
Best Dramatic Presentation - Long Form: Maddigan's Quest
Best New Talent: Douglas A. Van Belle

2008
Best Novel - Adult: Path of Revenge by Russell Kirkpatrick
Best Novel - Young Adult (tie): The Sea-wreck Stranger by Anna Mackenzie and Cybele's Secret by Juliet Marillier
Best Short Story (tie): "Fendraaken" by Kevin G. Maclean and "Mist and Murder" by Lucy Sussex
Best Novella/Novelette: Beat of Temptation by Nalini Singh
Best Anthology: Doorways for the Dispossessed by Paul Haines
Best Dramatic Presentation - Long Form: Black Sheep
Best Dramatic Presentation - Short Form: "Buy Kiwi Made" advertising campaign
Best New Talent: Tracie McBride
Services to Science Fiction: Andromeda Spaceways Inflight Magazine Publishing Co-operative

2009
Best Novel - Adult: Dark Heart by Russell Kirkpatrick
Best Novel - Young Adult: Thornspell by Helen Lowe
Best Short Story: "Under Waves and Over" by Grant Stone
Best Novella/Novelette: "Stroke of Enticement" by Nalini Singh
Best Collected Work: "The Invisible Road" by Elizabeth Knox
Best Professional Artwork: Cover for Newtons Sleep by Emma Weakley
Best Dramatic Presentation - Short Form: "Skankenstein" (music video)
Best Professional Publication: "Deputy Dan and The Mysterious Midnight Marauder" by Sally McLennan and Joel Liochon
Best New Talent: Helen Lowe

2010
Best Novel: Beyond The Wall Of Time by Russell Kirkpatrick
Best Young Adult Novel: Brainjack by Brian Falkner
Best Novella/Novelette: "Wives" by Paul Haines
Best Short Story (tie): "Corrigan's Exchange" by Ripley Patton and "The Living Dead Boy" by Grant Stone
Best Collected Work: "Voyagers: Science Fiction Poetry From New Zealand" by Mark Pirie and Tim Jones (editors)
Best Artwork: "The Test" by Serena Kearns
Best Dramatic Presentation - Long Form: "Under the Mountain" (dir. Jonathan King)
Best Production/Publication: "Semaphore Magazine" by Marie Hodgkinson
Best New Talent: Simon Petrie
Services to Science Fiction, Fantasy and Horror: Phillip Mann

2011
Best Novel (tie): The Heir Of Night by Helen Lowe and The Questing Road by Lyn McConchie
Best Young Adult Novel: Summer Of Dreaming by Lyn McConchie
Best Novella/Novelette:  "A Tale Of The Interferers - Hunger For Forbidden Flesh" by Paul Haines
Best Short Story: High Tide At Hot Water Beach by Paul Haines
Best Collected Work:  "A Foreign Country - New Zealand Speculative Fiction" by Anna Caro and Juliet Buchanan (editors)
Best Artwork: Cover for Tymon's Flight by Frank Victoria
Best Dramatic Presentation (tie): "This Is Not My Life" - Pilot Episode (Executive Producers: Gavin Strawhan, Rachel Lang, Steven O'Meagher, Tim White. Producer: Tim Sanders. Directors: Robert Sarkies, Peter Salmon. Associate Producer: Polly Fryer) and "Kaitangata Twitch" - Pilot Episode by Yvonne Mackay
Best Production/Publication: 	"White Cloud Worlds Anthology" by Paul Tobin (editor)
Best New Talent: Karen Healey
Services to Science Fiction, Fantasy and Horror: Simon Litten

2012
Best Novel: Samiha's Song by Mary Victoria
Best Youth Novel: Battle of the Birds by Lee Murray
Best Novella/Novelette:  "Steam Girl" by Dylan Horrocks
Best Short Story: Frankie and the Netball Clone by Alicia Ponder
Best Collected Work:  "Tales for Canterbury" by Cassie Hart and Anna Caro (editors)
Best Professional Artwork: Cover for Oracle's Fire by Frank Victoria
Best Dramatic Presentation: "The Almighty Johnsons" (Producer: Simon Bennett. Writers: Rachel Lang and James Griffin)
Best New Talent: K. D. Berry
Services to Science Fiction, Fantasy and Horror: Ripley Patton

2013
Best Novel: Queen of Iron Years by Lyn McConchie and Sharman Horwood 
Best Youth Novel: The Prince of Soul and the Lighthouse by Frederik Brounéus 
Best Novella/Novelette: "Flight 404" by Simon Petrie 
Best Short Story: Hope is the thing with feathers by Lee Murray
Best Collected Work: "Mansfield with Monsters" by Matt and Debbie Cowens 
Best Professional Artwork: Cover for Light Touch Paper, Stand Clear by Les Petersen
Best Professional Production/Publication: "The Hobbit: An Unexpected Journey: Chronicles" (Art and Design by Daniel Falconer (WetaNZ)
Best Dramatic Presentation: The Hobbit: An Unexpected Journey (Peter Jackson, Philippa Boyens, Fran Walsh, Guillermo del Toro)
Best New Talent: Matt and Debbie Cowens
Services to Science Fiction, Fantasy And Horror: Stephen Minchin

2014
 Best Novel: Heartwood by Freya Robertson
 Best Youth Novel: Raven Flight by Juliet Marillier
 Best Novella: Cave Fever by Lee Murray
 Best Short Story: By Bone-Light by Juliet Marillier
 Best Collected Work: Baby Teeth by Lee Murray and Dan Rabarts (editors)
 Best Professional Artwork: Cover for Regeneration: Best New Zealand Speculative Fiction by Emma Weakley
 Best Professional Publication/Production: WearableArt by Craig Potton
 Best Dramatic Presentation: The Almighty Johnsons (Season Three), South Pacific Films

2015 

 Best Novel: Engines of Empathy by Paul Mannering
 Best Youth Novel: The Caller: Shadowfell by Juliet Marillier
 Best Novella: Peach and Araxi by Celine Murray
 Best Short Story: Inside Ferndale by Lee Murray
 Best Collected Work: Lost in the Museum, Phoenix Writer's Group
 Best Professional Artwork: Cover for Lost in the Museum by Geoff Popham
 Best Professional Production/Publication: Weta: 20 Years of Imagination on Screen, Clare Burgess with Brian Stubley
 Best Dramatic Presentation: What We Do In The Shadows, dir Jemaine Clement and Taika Waititi

2016 

 Best Novel: Ardus by Jean Gilbert
 Best Youth Novel: Dragons Realm (You Say Which Way) by Eileen Mueller
 Best Novella/Novelette: The Ghost of Matter by Octavia Cade
 Best Short Story: The Thief's Tale by Lee Murray
 Best Collected Work: Work Off Line 2015: The Earth We Knew, Jean Gilbert and Chad Dick (editors)
 Best Professional Artwork: Cover for Shortcuts - Track 1 by Casey Bailey
 Best Professional Production/Publication: White Clouds World Anthology 3, Weta Workshops, Paul Tobin (editor)
 Best New Talent: Jean Gilbert
 Services to Science Fiction, Fantasy, and Horror: Marie Hodgkinson

2017 

 Best Novel: Into the Mist by Lee Murray
 Best Youth Novel: Light in My Dark by Jean Gilbert and William Dresden
 Best Novella/Novelette: The Convergence of Fairy Tales by Octavia Cade
 Best Short Story: Splintr by A.J. Fitzwater
 Best Collected Work: At the Edge, Dan Rabarts and Lee Murray (editors)
 Best Professional Artwork: Cover for At the Edge by Emma Weakley
 Best Professional Production/Publication: That Kind of Planet by Emma Weakley
 Best Dramatic Presentation: This Giant Papier Mache Boulder is Actually Really Heavy, dir Christian Nicholson
 Best New Talent: Eileen Mueller
 Services To Science Fiction, Fantasy And Horror: Lee Murray

2018 

 Best Novel: Hounds of the Underworld by Dan Rabarts and Lee Murray
 Best Youth Novel: The Traitor and the Thief by Gareth Ward
 Best Novella/Novelette: Matters Arising from the Identification of the Body by Simon Petrie
 Best Short Story: Crimson Birds of Small Miracles by Sean Monaghan
 Best Collected Work: Mariah's Prologues by Grace Bridges
 Best Professional Artwork: Cover for Teleport by Kate Strawbridge
 Best Professional Production/Publication: Mistlands by Layla Rose
 Best Dramatic Presentation: The Changeover, directed by Stuart McKenzie and Miranda Harcourt

2019 

 Best Novel: Into the Sounds by Lee Murray
 Best Youth Novel: Lutapolii – White Dragon of the South by Deryn Pittar
 Best Novella/Novelette: The Martian Job by M. Darusha Wehm
 Best Short Story: Girls Who do not Drown by A.C. Buchanan
 Best Collected Work: Te Korero Ahi Kā, edited by Grace Bridges, Lee Murray and Aaron Compton
 Best Professional Artwork: Cover for The Baker Thief by Laya Rose
 Best Professional Production/Publication: The Black Archive #15: Full Circle by John Toon
 Best Dramatic Presentation: Wellington Paranormal, directed by Jemaine Clement and Jackie van Beek

2020 

 Best Novel: The Dawnhounds by Sascha Stronach
 Best Youth Novel: The Clockill and the Thief by Gareth Ward
 Best Novella/Novelette: From A Shadow Grave by Andi C. Buchanan
 Best Short Story: A Shriek Across The Sky by Casey Lucas
 Best Collected Work: Year’s Best Aotearoa New Zealand Science Fiction and Fantasy, Vol 1, edited by Marie Hodgkinson
 Best Professional Artwork: Cover for Dragon Pearl by Vivienne To
 Best Professional Production/Publication: Swords: The Webcomic by Matthew Wills
 Best Dramatic Presentation: Dr Who: The Elysian Blade, David Bishop

2021 
 Best Novel: The Stone Wētā by Octavia Cade
Best Youth Novel: These Violent Delights by Chloe Gong
Best Novella/Novelette: No Man’s Land by A. J. Fitzwater
Best Short Story: For Want of Parts by Casey Lucas
Best Collected Work: The Voyages of Cinrak the Dapper by A. J. Fitzwater
Best Professional Artwork: Laya Rose, for the cover art for No Man’s Land by A. J. Fitzwater
Best Professional Production/Publication: How New Zealand's Best Fantasy and Science Fiction Authors got Shafted on a Global Stage by Casey Lucas

Fan award winners since 2002

2002
Best Fan Writing: Alan Robson
Best Fanzine: Phoenixine
Best Fan Art: Nick Kim
Services to Fandom: Norman Cates and the SFFANZ discussion group

2003
Best Fan Writing: Alan Robson
Best Fanzine: Phoenixine
Best Fan Art: Grant Preston
Services to Fandom: William Geradts and Adele Geradts

2004
Best Fanzine: Phoenixine
Services to Fandom: Laurie Fleming

2005
Best Fan Writing: Alan Robson
Best Fanzine (tied): Phoenixine and Time Space Visualiser
Services to Fandom: Martin Kealey

2006
Best Fan Writing: Alan Robson
Best Fanzine: Phoenixine
Best Fan Production: King (short film)
Services to Fandom: Norman Cates

2007
Best Fan Writing: Alan Robson
Services to Fandom: John and Lynelle Howell

2008
Best Fan Writing: Ross Temple
Best Fanzine: Phoenixine
Best Fan Production: Renaldo, First Sheep on the Moon?
Services to Fandom: Simon Litten

2009
Best Fan Writing: "Disappointment" (article by Alex Lindsay)
Best Fan Production: Chasing the Bard (podcast by Philippa Ballantine)
Best Fan Publication: The Girl Who Asked for Wisdom and Other Stories by Catherine and Stephanie Pegg
Services to Fandom: Maree Pavletich

2010
Best Fan Writing: "SJV Watch" and "SFFANZ Reviews" (articles by Simon Litten)
Best Fan Production: Coals To Newcastle (short film by Yvonne Harrison)
Best Fan Publication (tie): Phoenixine by  John and Lynelle Howell (editors) and Time Space Visualiser by Adam McGechen (editor)
Services to Fandom: David Lee-Smith

2011
Best Fan Writing: "Musings From Under The Mountain" and Novazine contributions by Jacqui Smith
Best Fan Production: Doctor Who (podcast by Paul Mannering)
Best Fan Publication: Novazine by Jacqui Smith (editor)
Best Fan Artwork: Cover for StarshipSofa 150 by Gino Moretto
Services to Fandom: Ross Temple

2012
Best Fan Writing: Various articles for Phoenixine and Novazine by Simon Litten
Best Fan Publication: Phoenixine
Best Fan Artwork: Various artwork in Phoenixine by Nick Kim
Services to Fandom: Jacqui and Keith Smith

2013
Best Fan Writing: "Strange Matter" and occasional essays within Phoenixine by John Toon 
Best Fan Production: AetherCon 
Best Fan Publication: Phoenixine 
Best Fan Artwork: Contributions to Novazine by Keith Smith
Services to Fandom: Annette Bergner

2014
 Best Fan Writing (tie): Alan Parker "Presidential Address", Novazine; Lynnelle Howell "Presidential Sweet/DuhVice", Phoenixine
 Best Fan Production/Publication: Phoenixine, John and Lynelle Howell
 Best New Talent: Dan Rabarts
 Services to Fandom: The League of Victorian Imagineers
 Services to Science Fiction, Fantasy, and Horror: Helen Lowe

2015
 Best Fan Writing: Rebecca Fisher
 Best Fan Production/Publication: Phoenixine, John and Lynelle Howell
 Best Fan Artwork: Keith Smith, Novazine
 Best New Talent: A.J. Fitzwater
 Services to Science Fiction, Fantasy, and Horror: Hugh Cook

2016
 Best Fan Writing: John Toon, Phoenixine
 Best Fan Production/Publication: Phoenixine, John and Lynelle Howell
 Best Fan Artist: Keith Smith
 Services to Fandom: Glenn Young

2017
 Best Fan Writing: Octavia Cade
 Best Fan Production/ Publication: Summer Star Trek: Mirror, Mirror, Enterprise Entertainment
 Best Fan Artist: Keith Smith
 Services to Fandom: Lynelle Howell

Notes

External links
SFFANZ Vogel Awards page
New Zealand Book Council Vogel Awards page
Bookawards.co.nz Vogel Awards page
Biography of Vogel at the Dictionary of New Zealand Biography

Science fiction awards
New Zealand fiction awards
New Zealand science fiction
New Zealand fantasy
Awards established in 1989